Protein transport protein Sec24D is a protein that in humans is encoded by the SEC24D gene.

The protein encoded by this gene is a member of the SEC24 subfamily of the SEC23/SEC24 family, which is involved in vesicle trafficking. The encoded protein has similarity to yeast Sec24p component of COPII. COPII is the coat protein complex responsible for vesicle budding from the ER. The role of this gene product is implicated in the shaping of the vesicle, and also in cargo selection and concentration.

References

Further reading